In phonetics, a flap or tap is a type of consonantal sound, which is produced with a single contraction of the muscles so that one articulator (such as the tongue) is thrown against another.

Contrast with stops and trills
The main difference between a tap or flap and a stop is that in a tap/flap there is no buildup of air pressure behind the place of articulation and consequently no release burst. Otherwise a tap/flap is similar to a brief stop.

Taps and flaps also contrast with trills, where the airstream causes the articulator to vibrate. Trills may be realized as a single contact, like a tap or flap, but are variable, whereas a tap/flap is limited to a single contact. When a trill is brief and made with a single contact it is sometimes erroneously described as an (allophonic) tap/flap, but a true tap or flap is an active articulation whereas a trill is a passive articulation. That is, for a tap or flap the tongue makes an active gesture to contact the target place of articulation, whereas with a trill the contact is due to the vibration caused by the airstream rather than any active movement.

Tap vs. flap
Many linguists use the terms tap and flap indiscriminately. Peter Ladefoged proposed for a while that it might be useful to distinguish between them. However, his usage was inconsistent and contradicted itself even between different editions of the same text. One proposed version of the distinction was that a tap strikes its point of contact directly, as a very brief stop, but a flap strikes the point of contact tangentially: "Flaps are most typically made by retracting the tongue tip behind the alveolar ridge and moving it forward so that it strikes the ridge in passing."

Later, however, he used the term flap in all cases. Subsequent work on the labiodental flap has clarified the issue: flaps involve retraction of the active articulator, and a forward-striking movement.

In IPA terms the retroflex flap  symbol captures the initial retraction and subsequent forward movement of the tongue tip involved. Otherwise, alveolars are typically called taps, and other articulations are called flaps.

A few languages have been reported to contrast a tap and a flap at the same place of articulation. This is the case for Norwegian, in which the alveolar apical tap  and the post-alveolar/retroflex apical flap  have the same place of articulation for some speakers,
and Kamviri, which also has apical alveolar taps and flaps.

IPA symbols
The tap and flap consonants identified by the International Phonetic Alphabet are:

The Kiel Convention of the IPA recommended that for other taps and flaps, a homorganic consonant, such as a stop or trill, should be used with a breve diacritic:

However, the former could be mistaken for a short trill, and is more clearly transcribed , whereas for a nasal tap the unambiguous transcription  is generally used.

Types of taps and flaps

Most of the alternative transcriptions in parentheses imply a tap rather than flap articulation, so for example the flap  and the tapped stop  are arguably distinct, as are flapped  and tapped .

Alveolar taps and flaps

Spanish features a good illustration of an alveolar flap, contrasting it with a trill: pero  "but" vs. perro  "dog". Among the Germanic languages, the tap allophone occurs in American and Australian English and in Northern Low Saxon.

In Galician, Portuguese and Sardinian, a flap often appears instead of a former . This is part of a wider phenomenon called rhotacism.

Retroflex flaps
Most Indic and Dravidian languages have retroflex flaps. In Hindi there are three, a simple retroflex flap as in  big, a murmured retroflex flap as in  leper, and a retroflex nasal flap in the Hindicized pronunciation of Sanskrit  ruby. Some of these may be allophonic.

A retroflex flap is also common in Norwegian dialects and some Swedish dialects.

Lateral taps and flaps
Many of the languages of Africa, Asia, and the Pacific that do not distinguish [r] from l may have a lateral flap. This has been suggested to be the case for Japanese, for example.

The Iwaidja language of Australia has both alveolar and retroflex lateral flaps. These contrast with lateral approximants at the same positions, as well as a retroflex tap , alveolar tap , and retroflex approximant . However, the flapped, or tapped, laterals in Iwaidja are distinct from 'lateral flaps' as represented by the corresponding IPA symbols (see below). These phones consist of a flap component followed by a lateral component, whereas In Iwaidja the opposite is the case. For this reason, current IPA transcriptions of these sounds by linguists working on the language consist of an alveolar lateral followed by a superscript alveolar tap and a retroflex lateral followed by a superscript retroflex tap.

A velar lateral tap may exist as an allophone in a few languages of New Guinea, according to Peter Ladefoged and Ian Maddieson.

Non-coronal flaps
The only common non-coronal flap is the labiodental flap, found throughout central Africa in languages such as Margi. In 2005, the IPA adopted a right-hook v,

for this sound. (Supported by some fonts: .) Previously, it had been transcribed with the use of the breve diacritic, or other ad hoc symbols.

Other taps or flaps are much less common. They include an epiglottal tap; a bilabial flap in Banda, which may be an allophone of the labiodental flap; and a velar lateral tap as an allophone in Kanite and Melpa. Note here that, like a velar trill, a central velar flap or tap is not possible because the tongue and soft palate cannot move together easily enough to produce a sound.

If other flaps are found, the breve diacritic could be used to represent them, but would more properly be combined with the symbol for the corresponding voiced stop. A palatal or uvular tap or flap, which unlike a velar tap is believed to be articulatorily possible, could be represented this way (by ).

Though deemed impossible on the IPA chart, a velar tap has been reported to occur allophonically in the Kamviri dialect of the Kamkata-vari language and in Dàgáárè, though at least in the latter case this may in fact be a palatal tap.

Nasal taps and flaps
Nasalized consonants include taps and flaps, although these are rarely phonemic. Many West African languages have a nasal flap  (or ) as an allophone of  before a nasal vowel; Pashto, however, has a phonemic nasal retroflex lateral flap.

Tapped fricatives
Voiced and voiceless tapped alveolar fricatives have been reported from a few languages. Flapped fricatives are possible but do not seem to be used. See voiced alveolar tapped fricative, voiceless alveolar tapped fricative.

See also
List of phonetics topics

Notes

References

External links
A Crosslinguistic Lexicon of the Labial Flap

 
Manner of articulation